Monica Seles was the defending champion, but lost in the second round to Lina Krasnoroutskaya.

Anastasia Myskina won the title, defeating Elena Likhovtseva 6–3, 6–1 in an all-Russian final.

Singles results

Seeds
 The top two seeds received a bye into the second round.

Finals

Top half

Bottom half

Qualifying

Seeds

 n/a
  Evie Dominikovic (first round)
  María Sánchez Lorenzo (qualifying competition)
  Petra Mandula (first round)
 n/a
  Wynne Prakusya (second round)
  Ľubomíra Kurhajcová (second round)
  Mara Santangelo (first round)

Qualifiers

Draw

First qualifier

Second qualifier

Third qualifier

Fourth qualifier

References

External links
 ITF Tournament Details
 WTA Tournament Match Notes
 Main and Qualifying Draws (WTA)

2003 WTA Tour
2003 Qatar Total Fina Elf Open - 1
2003 in Qatari sport